The Thomas & Evon Cooper International Competition (also known simply as the Cooper International Competition) is a piano and violin competition held annually at the Oberlin College in Oberlin, Ohio. It is sponsored by Thomas and Evon Cooper and is presented jointly by the Oberlin Conservatory of Music and the Cleveland Orchestra. The competition is for young musicians 13–18 years of age and awards more than $35,000 in prize money, with a first prize of $20,000. The competition gives three finalists the opportunity to play a complete concerto with the Cleveland Orchestra. The competition debuted in the summer of 2010 with a piano competition, followed by a violin competition in 2011, and the competition alternates annually between both instruments. George Li won the first prize in the first piano competition and Sirena Huang won first in the first violin competition.

History 
The competition originated as the Oberlin International Festival,  first organized by Emeritus Professor Joseph Schwartz in 1985. In 1995,  Professor Robert Shannon became the director and the first annual Oberlin International Piano Competition was launched. In 1999, Yeol Eum Son won 1st prize. By the time of its final edition, it gave the winners opportunities to perform with leading orchestras in China, such as the Shanghai Philharmonic.   In 2009, the competition was not held due to renovations of the concert hall. In 2010, a new competition named after sponsors Thomas and Evon Cooper replaced it. Since then, the competition holds its final rounds with the Cleveland Orchestra in Severance Hall. In 2016, the competition doubled its prizes to a $20,000 first prize.

Prize winners

Thomas & Evon Cooper International Competition

Oberlin International Piano Competition

References

External links
 
 A documentary about the first Cooper International Piano Competition
 A documentary about the first Cooper International Violin Competition

Piano competitions in the United States
Violin competitions
Oberlin College